The 2016 Springfield Lasers season was the 21st season of the franchise in World TeamTennis (WTT). The Lasers finished with 4 wins and 8 losses, fifth in the WTT standings, and missed the postseason for the second consecutive year. The team featured Michaëlla Krajicek, who won the 2016 WTT Female Rookie of the Year Award.

Season recap

Draft
At the WTT Draft on March 25, 2016, the Lasers protected the top-ranked American player John Isner in the first round of the marquee player portion of the draft and passed on making a second-round selection. In the roster player portion of the draft, the Lasers made a trade with the expansion New York Empire, which was interested in selecting Christina McHale. In the trade, the Lasers gave the Empire the first overall selection in the roster player portion of the draft along with the first pick in the fourth round in exchange for the third pick in each of the first and third rounds. The Lasers did not protect any players in the roster portion of the draft. They selected Daniel Nestor, Benjamin Becker, Daria Gavrilova and Michaëlla Krajicek. Nestor was the only one of the four with WTT experience. He was WTT Male Rookie of the Year playing for the Sacramento Capitals in 2003, and WTT Male Most Valuable Player as a member of the Philadelphia Freedoms in 2006. The Lasers elected not to choose a roster-exempt player in the fifth round.

Parmentier replaces Gavrilova
Daria Gavrilova was selected to represent Australia at the 2016 Summer Olympics on July 1, 2016. She was replaced on the roster by Pauline Parmentier on July 23, 2016.

Nestor selected to Canadian Olympic team
On July 21, 2016, Daniel Nestor was selected to represent Canada at the 2016 Summer Olympics, playing men's doubles in place of Milos Raonic, who withdrew citing concerns about the Zica virus. To fill the void created by Nestor's departure, the Lasers signed Jean Andersen and Eric Butorac as substitute players on July 26, 2016. Andersen previously played for the Lasers in 2011 and 2014.

Lasers hand Freedoms first two losses
After starting the season with four straight losses, the Lasers faced the undefeated Philadelphia Freedoms on the road on August 4, 2016. Two of the Lasers' four losses had already come at the hands of the Freedoms. Jean Andersen and Benjamin Becker got the Lasers started by winning a tiebreaker in the opening set of men's doubles. Michaëlla Krajicek and Pauline Parmentier followed by getting an early break in the women's doubles set that led to a 5–3 set win and a 10–7 lead in the match for the Lasers. Becker lost a tiebreaker to Lukáš Lacko in the third set of men's singles to cut the lead to 14–12. Parmentier raced to a 3–0 lead in the fourth set of women's singles, before Naomi Broady broke back to send the set to a tiebreaker. Parmentier survived a set point down 3–4 in the tiebreaker on Broady's serve and then hit a forehand winner on the set's deciding point to push the Lasers' lead to 19–16. Becker and Krajicek sealed the match in mixed doubles by holding all their service games and breaking Broady once to win the set, 5–3, and give the Lasers a 24–19 victory.

The Lasers and Freedoms met again the following evening in Springfield. After dropping the opening set of men's doubles in a tiebreaker, the Lasers took control of the match by winning the next three sets led by Krajicek. She teamed with Parmentier to take the women's doubles, 5–3, then with Becker to take the mixed doubles by the same score. In the fourth set of women's singles, Krajicek topped Samantha Crawford, 5–2, to give the Lasers a 19–13 lead. In the final set of men's singles, Lacko earned a break against Becker and won the set, 5–3, to send the math to extended play with the Lasers leading, 22–18. Becker held serve, 4–1, in the first game of extended play to clinch a 23–18 win for the Lasers.

Elimination from postseason contention
The Lasers were eliminated from postseason contention with a record of 2 wins and 7 losses on August 10, 2016, when they lost to the Orange County Breakers, 22–19, in extended play. It is the second consecutive season the Lasers have missed the postseason.

Season finale
The Lasers met the New York Empire in the season finale for both teams at home on August 13, 2016. The loser of the match would finish last in WTT. Benjamin Becker and Eric Butorac opened the match by winning a tiebreaker in men's doubles. Michaëlla Krajicek and Pauline Parmentier followed with a 5–3 set win in women's doubles. Krajicek and Butorac teamed for a 5–1 mixed doubles set win that gave the Lasers a 15–8 lead. After dropping the fourth set of women's singles, the Lasers took a 17–13 lead to the final set. Marcus Willis won the men's singles set in a tiebreaker to send the match to extended play with the Lasers leading 21–18. After Willis won the first game of extended play, Becker won the second to secure a 22–19 victory and a fifth-place finish.

Rookie of the Year Award
Michaëlla Krajicek was named 2016 WTT Female Rookie of the Year. Krajicek was tied for fifth in the league with teammate Pauline Parmentier in winning percentage in women's doubles and was also fifth in mixed doubles.

Event chronology
 March 25, 2016: The Lasers protected John Isner and selected Daniel Nestor, Benjamin Becker, Daria Gavrilova and Michaëlla Krajicek at the WTT Draft. The Lasers left Andre Begemann, Alison Riske, Varvara Lepchenko, Sachia Vickery, Anna-Lena Grönefeld and Michael Russell unprotected.
 July 23, 2016: The Lasers signed Pauline Parmentier as a roster player to replace Daria Gavrilova.
 July 26, 2016: The Lasers signed Jean Andersen and Eric Butorac as substitute players.
 August 10, 2016: The Lasers were eliminated from postseason contention with a record of 2 wins and 7 losses, when they lost to the Orange County Breakers, 22–19, in extended play. It is the second consecutive season the Lasers have missed the postseason.

Draft picks
Since the Lasers had the worst record in WTT in 2014, they had the first selection in each round of the draft. WTT conducted its 2016 draft on March 25, in Key Biscayne, Florida. in the roster player portion of the draft, the Lasers traded the first overall selection along with the first pick in the fourth round to the New York Empire in exchange for the third pick in each of the first and third rounds. The selections made by the Lasers are shown in the table below.

Match log
{| align="center" border="1" cellpadding="2" cellspacing="1" style="border:1px solid #aaa"
|-
! colspan="2" style="background:#3d1e56; color:#25d0ff" | Legend
|-
! bgcolor="ccffcc" | Lasers Win
! bgcolor="ffbbbb" | Lasers Loss
|-
! colspan="2" | Home team in CAPS
|}

Team personnel
Reference:

On-court personnel
  John-Laffnie de Jager – Head Coach
  Jean Andersen
  Benjamin Becker
  Eric Butorac
  Daria Gavrilova
  John Isner
  Michaëlla Krajicek
  Daniel Nestor
  Pauline Parmentier

Front office
 John Cooper representing Springfield-Greene County Park Board – Owner
 Bob Belote – Director
 Paul Nahon – General Manager

Notes:

Statistics
Players are listed in order of their game-winning percentage provided they played in at least 40% of the Lasers' games in that event, which is the WTT minimum for qualification for league leaders in individual statistical categories.

Men's singles

Women's singles

Men's doubles

Women's doubles

Mixed doubles

Team totals

Transactions
 March 25, 2016: The Lasers protected John Isner and selected Daniel Nestor, Benjamin Becker, Daria Gavrilova and Michaëlla Krajicek at the WTT Draft. The Lasers left Andre Begemann, Alison Riske, Varvara Lepchenko, Sachia Vickery, Anna-Lena Grönefeld and Michael Russell unprotected.
 July 23, 2016: The Lasers signed Pauline Parmentier as a roster player to replace Daria Gavrilova.
 July 26, 2016: The Lasers signed Jean Andersen and Eric Butorac as substitute players.

Individual honors and achievements
Michaëlla Krajicek was named 2016 WTT Female Rookie of the Year. Krajicek was tied for fifth in the league with teammate Pauline Parmentier in winning percentage in women's doubles and was also fifth in mixed doubles.

Benjamin Becker was second in WTT in winning percentage in men's singles.

See also

 Sports in Missouri

References

External links
Springfield Lasers official website
World TeamTennis official website

Springfield Lasers season
Springfield Lasers 2016
Springfield Lasers